Angelus Novus (New Angel) is a 1920 monoprint by the Swiss-German artist Paul Klee, using the oil transfer method he invented. It is now in the collection of the Israel Museum in Jerusalem.

History
The artist's friend Walter Benjamin, a noted German critic and philosopher, purchased the print in 1921. In September 1940 Benjamin committed suicide during an attempt to flee the Nazi regime. After World War II, Benjamin's friend Gershom Scholem, a distinguished scholar of Jewish mysticism, inherited the drawing. According to Scholem, Benjamin felt a mystical identification with the Angelus Novus and incorporated it in his theory of the “angel of history,” a melancholy view of historical process as an unceasing cycle of despair.

In the ninth thesis of his 1940 essay “Theses on the Philosophy of History”, Benjamin describes Angelus Novus as an image of the angel of history:

A Klee painting named Angelus Novus shows an angel looking as though he is about to move away from something he is fixedly contemplating. His eyes are staring, his mouth is open, his wings are spread. This is how one pictures the angel of history. His face is turned toward the past. Where we perceive a chain of events, he sees one single catastrophe which keeps piling wreckage upon wreckage and hurls it in front of his feet. The angel would like to stay, awaken the dead, and make whole what has been smashed. But a storm is blowing from Paradise; it has got caught in his wings with such violence that the angel can no longer close them. The storm irresistibly propels him into the future to which his back is turned, while the pile of debris before him grows skyward. This storm is what we call progress.

In 2015, in conjunction with her solo exhibition at the Tel Aviv Museum of Art, American artist R. H. Quaytman discovered that the monoprint had become adhered to an 1838 copperplate engraving by Friedrich Müller after a portrait of Martin Luther by Lucas Cranach.

Legacy
The name and concept of Klee's "New Angel" has inspired works by other artists, filmmakers, writers and musicians, including John Akomfrah, Ariella Azoulay, Carolyn Forché, Rabih Alameddine, and Ruth Ozeki.

In 1997, German art historian Otto Karl Werckmeister included Klee's "New Angel" image among his selection of "icons of the left." He discussed Benjamin's use of the painting as an important contribution to its iconic status.

See also
List of works by Paul Klee

References

External links

1920 paintings
Paintings by Paul Klee
Walter Benjamin
Angels in art